Irena may refer to:

People
Irena (name)

Places
Irena, Missouri, a village in the United States
Irena, Subcarpathian Voivodeship, a village in south-east Poland
Irena, Lublin Voivodeship, a town in eastern Poland, merged into nearby Dęblin in 1953

Other uses
 International Renewable Energy Agency, an intergovernmental organisation mandated to promote adoption and use of renewable energy
Irena (bird), a genus of passerine birds
 IRENA, the Nicaraguan Institute of Natural Resources and the Environment, now the Ministry of the Environment and Natural Resources

See also
Irene (disambiguation)